Cantoni is a surname. Notable people with the surname include:

Attilio Cantoni (1931–2017) – Italian rower
Domenico Cantoni (born 1966) – Italian lightweight rower
Eitel Cantoni (1906–1997), Uruguayan racing driver
Giovanni Cantoni (1818–1897), Italian physicist
Giulio Cantoni (1915–2005), American biochemist
Jack Cantoni (1948–2013), French rugby union player
Lelio Cantoni (1802–1857), Italian rabbi
Mark Cantoni, Australian rugby league player
Raffaele Cantoni (1896–1971), Italian anti-Fascist and Jewish resistance member
Simone Cantoni (1736–1818), Swiss architect
Tammy Cantoni (born 1972), Australian pool and snooker player
Vincent Cantoni, French rugby league footballer

Italian-language surnames